Sally Hibbin (born 3 July 1953) is a British independent film producer, known for her work on low budget films with directors like Ken Loach and Phil Davis as well as producers like Sarah Curtis and Rebecca O'Brien. She has produced various British independent films and some television productions.

She was born on 3 July 1953 in North London. She is the daughter of Nina Hibbin; film critic for the communist Daily Worker (later the Morning Star). Her career also began as a journalist until she founded her independent production company, Parallax Pictures in 1981. She had a lengthy cooperation with Ken Loach, which began in the early 1990s and was “a pivotal period in the director's career”, with films like Riff-Raff (1991), Raining Stones (1993), Ladybird, Ladybird (1994), Land and Freedom (1995) and Carla's Song (1996). She also worked with television directors such as  Les Blair on feature films like Bad Behaviour (1993) and Stand and Deliver (1997), as well as actor Phil Davis on his directorial debut motion picture, I.D. (1995) and then, Hold Back the Night (1998).

With Skreba Films, Hibbin produced A Very British Coup (miniseries) (1988) for Channel 4, a three-part dramatization of the novel by MP, Chris Mullin, depicting United Kingdom under a genuinely socialist Labour government. The series won four BAFTA Awards in 1989 - for Best Actor (Ray McAnally), Best Drama Series (Sally Hibbin, Alan Plater, Anne Skinner and Mick Jackson), Best Film Editor (Don Fairservice) and Best Film Sound (Christian Wangler, David Old and Peter Elliott ) – and a 1988 International Emmy Award for Best Drama. Her other award winning productions are Riff-Raff (1991), which won the Critics' Award at Cannes Film Festival as well as the inaugural Felix for Best European Film, and I Know You Know, which won the BAFTA Cymru award in 2009.

Sally Hibbin is also the author of three books on James Bond films.

Filmography

As Producer
 1982: Live a Life (Documentary)
 1983: The Road to Gdansk (TV Movie documentary)
 1985:  Policing London (Documentary short)
 1988: A Very British Coup (miniseries)  (TV Mini-Series)
 1991: Riff-Raff 
 1993: Raining Stones 
 1994: Ladybird, Ladybird (film) 
 1995: I.D. (1995 film) 
 1996: Carla's Song 
1998: Pat Condell: Stand and Deliver (TV Special documentary)
 1999: Dockers (film) (TV Movie)
1999: Hold Back the Night 
2003: Blind Flight 
2004: Yasmin (2004 film) 
2006: Almost Adult 
2008: I Know You Know 
2016: ID2: Shadwell Army

As Executive Producer
1993: Bad Behaviour (1993 film) 
1995: Land and Freedom 
1995: The Englishman Who Went Up a Hill But Came Down a Mountain 
1998: The Governess 
1998: Shark Hunt 
2000: Liam (film) 
2002: The Intended 
2011: Biatch! (Short)

Books 

The Official James Bond 007 Movie Book (1987)
The Making Of Licence To Kill (1989)

References

External links 
 
 
 

1953 births
Living people
British film producers